Élise Marc (born 25 October 1987) is a French Paralympic cyclist and paratriathlete. She is a two-time World and European champion in the paratriathlon and is a World silver medalist in road cycling. Marc lost her legs following an accident in 2004.

References

External links

 
 

1987 births
Living people
People from Échirolles
French female cyclists
French female triathletes
Paralympic cyclists of France
Paratriathletes of France
Paratriathletes at the 2016 Summer Paralympics
Cyclists at the 2020 Summer Paralympics
Sportspeople from Isère
Cyclists from Auvergne-Rhône-Alpes